The Association of Speakers Clubs (ASC) is a British confederation of about 150 clubs around the country that promote the skill of public speaking.

History
The ASC was formed by de-merger from Toastmasters International (TI) in 1973. Most of the TI clubs in Scotland and northern and central England joined the ASC.

External links

Speakers Trust

Communication skills training
Public speaking organizations